Alois Ngwerume (born 21 August 1983) is a Zimbabwean former footballer who last played for Mbabane Swallows of the Swazi Premier League in 2014.

Career

South Africa
Netting 6 goals during his first season with Moroka Swallows of the South African Premier Division in 2003, Ngwerume aimed to top the scorers' chart in 2004/05 The Zimbabwean next returned to South Africa in 2011, where he adapted to the role of central midfielder with Jomo Cosmos.

Mbabane Swallows
Joining 2012-13 Swazi Premier League champions Mbabane Swallows after their 2014 Swazi Charity Cup success, Ngwerume was forced to leave in December that year, much to the annoyance of local fans. Following his stint there, Ngwerume was inexorable that he would never return to Swaziland.

References

External links
 at Footballdatabase.eu
 at Soccerway

Association football forwards
Living people
1983 births
Moroka Swallows F.C. players
Jomo Cosmos F.C. players
Mbabane Swallows players
Expatriate footballers in Eswatini
Zimbabwean footballers
Association football midfielders
Zimbabwean expatriate footballers
South African Premier Division players
Expatriate soccer players in South Africa
Zimbabwean expatriate sportspeople in South Africa